John Edward Porter (June 1, 1935 – June 3, 2022) was an American lawyer and politician who served as U.S. Representative for Illinois's 10th congressional district from 1980 to 2001.

Career before Congress 
Before his election to Congress, Porter served in the Illinois House of Representatives and prior to that as an Honor Law Graduate Attorney with the U.S. Department of Justice in the Kennedy Administration. He attended Massachusetts Institute of Technology and was a graduate of Northwestern University and, with distinction of the University of Michigan Law School. Porter had ten honorary degrees.

Tenure 
During his tenure, Porter served on the United States House Committee on Appropriations and as chair of the Appropriations Subcommittee on Labor, Health and Human Services, Education, and Related Agencies. Under his subcommittee’s jurisdiction were all the health programs and agencies, including National Institutes of Health (NIH) and Centers for Disease Control and Prevention (CDC), except U.S. Food and Drug Administration (FDA) and all of the education programs and agencies of the federal government. During his chairmanship he led efforts resulting in doubling funding for the NIH.

He was founder and Co-Chairman of the Congressional Human Rights Caucus, a voluntary association of more than 250 Members of Congress working to identify, monitor, and end human rights violations worldwide. He co-authored legislation creating Radio Free Asia and served as Chair of the Global Legislators Organized for a Balanced Environment (GLOBE USA).

A protégée and former member of Porter’s staff was Mark Kirk, who would later replace Porter in the House and be elected to the U.S. Senate.

Later life and death 
He was a partner and served as Senior Advisor to the international lawfirm Hogan Lovells.  He served as Research!America Chair Emeritus and was Vice-Chair of the Foundation for the National Institutes of Health. He was member of the National Academy of Medicine and for 32 years, was a member of the Council on Foreign Relations. Porter was also a member of the Inter-American Dialogue. He was Chairman of PBS, a trustee of the Brookings Institution and served on the boards of the RAND Corporation, the American Heart Association, the PBS Foundation, and the John F. Kennedy Center for the Performing Arts. Among over 275 awards for his service in Congress is the Mary Wood Lasker Award for Public Service. In 2014, he was awarded the Public Welfare Medal from the National Academy of Sciences.

Porter was a resident of Alexandria, Virginia. He died from pneumonia at a hospital in Fairfax County, Virginia, on June 3, 2022, aged 87.

Legacy 
The 84,500 square foot John Edward Porter Neuroscience Research Center on the campus of the National Institutes of Health is named in his honor. It was dedicated on March 31, 2014. Porter is the 2014 recipient of the National Academy of Sciences Public Welfare 
Medal, the Academy’s highest honor.

Involvement in science

In 2000, he was awarded The Mary Woodard Lasker Public Service Award "for wise and perceptive leadership on behalf of medical research funding and a deep commitment to strengthening the science enterprise." He has also received the Albert Sabin Hero of Science Award from Americans for Medical Progress for his consistent advocacy for medical research.

References

External links

 Lasker foundation essay
 

|-

|-

1935 births
2022 deaths
20th-century American politicians
21st-century American politicians
Deaths from pneumonia in Virginia
Evanston Township High School alumni
Illinois lawyers
Members of the Illinois House of Representatives
Members of the Inter-American Dialogue
Military personnel from Illinois
Northwestern University alumni
People associated with Hogan Lovells
People from Evanston, Illinois
People from Wilmette, Illinois
Republican Party members of the United States House of Representatives from Illinois
University of Michigan Law School alumni
Virginia Republicans
Members of the National Academy of Medicine